MP2 or MP-2 may refer to:

Aviation
 The second terminal of Marseille Provence Airport
 Chyetverikov ARK-3 flying-boat

Firearms
 German Army designation for the Uzi
 MP-2 machine pistol

Science
 MP 2, an abbreviation for a zone during the Paleocene
 Møller–Plesset perturbation theory of the second order, a method in the field of computational chemistry

Technology

File formats
 MPEG-2 video format
 MPEG-1 Audio Layer II audio compression format and  file format

Video games
 Mario Party 2, a 1999 party game for the Nintendo 64 and the second game for the console
 Max Payne 2: The Fall of Max Payne, a 2003 shooter game
 Metroid Prime 2: Echoes, a 2004 action-adventure game